The International Convention on the Control of Harmful Anti-fouling Systems in Ships (AFS Convention) is a 2001 International Maritime Organization (IMO) treaty whereby states agree to prohibit the use of harmful anti-fouling paints and other anti-fouling systems that contain harmful substances. In particular, the use of the organotin tributyltin is prohibited, since leaching of that chemical from the hulls of ships has been shown to cause deformations in oysters and sex changes in whelks.

The convention was concluded in London on 5 October 2001 and entered into force on 17 September 2008. As of November 2018, it has been ratified by 81 states, which includes 79 United Nations member states plus the Cook Islands and Niue. A ratifying state agrees to enforce the prohibitions of the convention on all ships flying its flag and on any ship that enters a port, shipyard, or offshore terminal of the state. The 81 ratifying states represent approximately 94 per cent of the gross tonnage of the world's merchant fleets.

External links
International Convention on the Control of Harmful Anti-fouling Systems in Ships, IMO information page
Text, gov.uk

International Convention on the Control of Harmful Anti-fouling Systems on Ships
International Convention on the Control of Harmful Anti-fouling Systems on Ships
International Convention on the Control of Harmful Anti-fouling Systems on Ships
International Maritime Organization treaties
Environmental treaties
Treaties concluded in 2001
Treaties entered into force in 2008
Treaties of Antigua and Barbuda
Treaties of Australia
Treaties of the Bahamas
Treaties of Bangladesh
Treaties of Barbados
Treaties of Belgium
Treaties of Brazil
Treaties of Bulgaria
Treaties of Canada
Treaties of Chile
Treaties of the People's Republic of China
Treaties of the Republic of the Congo
Treaties of the Cook Islands
Treaties of Croatia
Treaties of Cyprus
Treaties of Denmark
Treaties of Egypt
Treaties of Estonia
Treaties of Ethiopia
Treaties of Fiji
Treaties of Finland
Treaties of France
Treaties of Georgia (country)
Treaties of Germany
Treaties of Greece
Treaties of Grenada
Treaties of Hungary
Treaties of Japan
Treaties of Jordan
Treaties of India
Treaties of Indonesia
Treaties of Iran
Treaties of Ireland
Treaties of Italy
Treaties of Kenya
Treaties of Kiribati
Treaties of Latvia
Treaties of Lebanon
Treaties of Liberia
Treaties of Lithuania
Treaties of Luxembourg
Treaties of Malaysia
Treaties of Malta
Treaties of the Marshall Islands
Treaties of Mexico
Treaties of Mongolia
Treaties of Montenegro
Treaties of Morocco
Treaties of the Netherlands
Treaties of Nigeria
Treaties of Niue
Treaties of Norway
Treaties of Palau
Treaties of Panama
Treaties of the Philippines
Treaties of Poland
Treaties of South Korea
Treaties of Romania
Treaties of Russia
Treaties of Saint Kitts and Nevis
Treaties of Saudi Arabia
Treaties of Serbia
Treaties of Sierra Leone
Treaties of Singapore
Treaties of Slovenia
Treaties of South Africa
Treaties of Spain
Treaties of Sweden
Treaties of Switzerland
Treaties of Syria
Treaties of Togo
Treaties of Tonga
Treaties of Trinidad and Tobago
Treaties of Tunisia
Treaties of Tuvalu
Treaties of Ukraine
Treaties of the United Kingdom
Treaties of the United States
Treaties of Uruguay
Treaties of Vanuatu
Treaties of Vietnam
Treaties extended to the Faroe Islands
Treaties extended to Gibraltar
Treaties extended to the Isle of Man
Treaties extended to the British Virgin Islands
Treaties extended to Macau
Treaties extended to the Caribbean Netherlands
Treaties extended to Hong Kong